The Chapel Royal is an establishment in the Royal Household serving the spiritual needs of the sovereign and the British Royal Family. Historically it was a body of priests and singers that travelled with the monarch. The term is now also applied to the chapels within royal palaces, most notably at Hampton Court and St James's Palace, and other chapels within the Commonwealth designated as such by the monarch.  Within the Church of England, some of these royal chapels may also be referred to as Royal Peculiars, an ecclesiastical jurisdiction of the monarch.  The Dean of His Majesty's Chapels Royal is a royal household office that in modern times is usually held by the Bishop of London.

The Chapel Royal's most public role is to perform choral liturgical service. It has played a significant role in the musical life of the nation, with composers such as Tallis, Byrd, Bull, Gibbons and Purcell all having been members of the choir. The choir consists of Gentlemen of the Chapel Royal singing the lower parts alongside the boy choristers known as the Children of the Chapel.

History

Middle Ages

In its early history, the English chapel royal travelled, like the rest of the court, with the monarch and performed its functions wherever he or she was residing at the time.

An ordinance from the reign of Henry VI sets out the full membership of the chapel as of 1455: one Dean, 20 Chaplains and Clerks, seven Children, one Chaplain Confessor for the Household, and one Yeoman.

From the reign of Edward IV further details survive. The children were supervised by a Master of Song, chosen by the dean from among the Gentlemen of the Chapel Royal. They were allocated supplies of meat and ale, and their own servant. There were also two Yeoman of the Chapel who acted as epistlers, reading from the bible during services. These were appointed from Children of the Chapel whose voices had recently broken.

Tudor period

The chapel remained stable throughout the reign of Henry VIII and the Dissolution of the Monasteries. The number of singers did vary during this period however, without apparent reason, from between twenty to thirty gentlemen and eight to ten children. The chapel travelled with the King to the Field of the Cloth of Gold, and on the second invasion of France.

Drama

In the Tudor period, the chapel increasingly took on another, unofficial, function that grew in importance into the 17th century – performing in dramas. Both the gentlemen and the children would act in pageants and plays for the royal family, held in court on feast days such as Christmas. For example at Christmas 1514, the play "The Triumph of Love and Beauty" was written and presented by William Cornysh, then Master of the Children, and was performed to the King by members of the chapel, including the children.

The chapel achieved its greatest eminence during the reign of Elizabeth I, when William Byrd and Thomas Tallis were joint organists. The Master of the Children of the Chapel Royal had, until at least 1684, the power to impress promising boy trebles from provincial choirs for service in the chapel. The theatre company affiliated with the chapel, known as the Children of the Chapel Royal, produced plays at court and then commercially until the 1620s by playwrights including John Lyly, Ben Jonson and George Chapman.

17th century

In the 17th century the Chapel Royal had its own building in Whitehall, which burned down in 1698; since 1702 it has been based at St James's Palace. The English Chapel Royal became increasingly associated with Westminster Abbey, so that by 1625 over half of the Gentlemen of the English Chapel Royal were also members of the Westminster Abbey choir. In the 18th century the choristers sang the soprano parts in performances of Handel's oratorios and other works. Under Charles II, the choir was often augmented by violinists from the royal consort; at various times the chapel has also employed composers, lutenists and viol players.

Functions and functionaries
The Chapel Royal is a department of the Ecclesiastical Household, which was established in 1483, under Edward IV, as the Royal Free Chapel of the Household. The Chapel Royal is a grouping of clerics and musicians, rather than a physical building. Traditionally, the members of the Chapel Royal are divided into clerics, choristers, and gentlemen of the chapel. The Chapel Royal is a royal peculiar (a church institute outside the usual diocesan structure of the Church); it is one of the three major royal peculiars, the others being Westminster Abbey and the St George's Chapel, Windsor Castle (which includes the Royal Chapel of All Saints). The members of the ecclesiastical household in Scotland are supplied by the Church of Scotland, while the members of ecclesiastical household in England are supplied by the Church of England.

Since the 18th century, the Dean of the Chapel Royal in England has been the sitting Bishop of London, with control of music vested in the Sub-Dean (currently Paul Wright).

The Chapel Royal conducts the Service of Remembrance at the Cenotaph in Whitehall and combines with the choir of the host abbey or cathedral at the Royal Maundy service.

Locations
The Chapel's main locations have varied over the years. For example in the early Tudor period and in Elizabeth I's reign, the Chapel's activity was often centred on the Greenwich Palace and the Palace of Whitehall. 

Under Elizabeth II the Chapel's primary location is at St James's Palace.

United Kingdom

St James's Palace
The Chapel at St James's has been used regularly since 1702 and is the most commonly used facility today. Located in the main block of St James's Palace, it was built c. 1540 and altered since, most notably by Sir Robert Smirke in 1837. The large window to the right of the Palace gatehouse is in the north wall of this Chapel which is laid out on a north-south rather than the usual east-west axis. Its ceiling richly decorated with royal initials and coats of arms is said to have been painted by Holbein.

The separate Queen's Chapel, once also physically connected to the main building of St James's Palace, was built between 1623 and 1625 as a Roman Catholic Chapel, at a time when the construction of Popish churches was otherwise prohibited in England, for Queen Henrietta Maria, consort of Charles I. From the 1690s it was used by Continental Lutheran courtiers and became known as the German Chapel. The "Minister for many years" of the "Royal French Chapel" at St James's Palace was Pierre Rival (d.1730), one of whose sermons is published as Sermon prononcé le 7 de Juillet 1713 jour d'action de graces pour la paix dans la chapelle royale françoise du palais de Saint James. The adjacent palace apartments burnt down in 1809 but they were not rebuilt, and in 1856–57 Marlborough Road was laid out between the palace and the Queen's Chapel.

Windsor
At Windsor Castle is the largest Royal Peculiar, St George's Chapel, but it is governed by its own college, separate from St James's, Chapel Royal. Near the Royal Apartments, there is also the smaller Private Chapel. In the grounds of Windsor's Royal Lodge is the Royal Chapel of All Saints.

Scotland
In the 15th century it is believed that the Chapel Royal referred to a prebend in the Church of St Mary on the Rock, St Andrews. In 1501 James IV founded a new Chapel Royal in Stirling Castle, but from 1504 onwards the deanery of the Chapel Royal was held by successive Bishops of Galloway with the title of Bishop of the Chapel Royal and authority over all the royal palaces within Scotland. The Deanery was annexed to the Bishopric of Dunblane in 1621, and the Chapel Royal was moved to Holyrood. In 1688, following the Glorious Revolution, a mob in Edinburgh broke into the Abbey, entered the Chapel Royal and desecrated the royal tombs. From then on the building fell into decay, and became a roofless ruin. The restoration of the Abbey has been proposed several times since the 18th century – in 1835 by the architect James Gillespie Graham as a meeting place for the General Assembly of the Church of Scotland, and in 1906 as a chapel for the Knights of the Thistle – but both proposals were rejected.

Other Chapels Royal

At the daughter Chapel Royal at Hampton Court Palace, a permanent chorus was created in 1868. The chorus, which sings on Sundays and major feast days, consists of fourteen boy members and six gentlemen members. An organ was built in 1712 and most recently restored in 2013.

Two patronised Chapels Royal almost never attended by the monarch are the Chapels of St John the Evangelist and St Peter ad Vincula in the Tower of London, having their own chaplains and choirs. In 2012, Roger Hall, the Chaplain of the Tower of London, was made canon of the Chapel Royal at the Tower of London, the first such appointment since the 16th century.  In 2016, The King’s Chapel of the Savoy, in Westminster, London, which is the monarch's by right of the Duchy of Lancaster, was brought for ecclesiastical purposes within the jurisdiction of the Chapels Royal.

Chapels with a royal original purpose, but currently without royal patronage, include the Royal Chapel of St Katherine-upon-the-Hoe in the Royal Citadel in Plymouth. However, in 1927, King George V re-granted the title Royal Chapel to the Garrison Church.

Several other locations have also formerly hosted the Chapel Royal, including the former Chapel Royal in Brighton. This was used by visiting royalty and as the primary chapel of ease to St Peter's Church in Brighton. The chapel was formally separated from St. Peter's parish in 2010, and became a parish in its own right. Another former Chapel Royal was situated in Dublin prior to the independence of Ireland in the 1920s. The Chapel Royal in Dublin operated within Dublin Castle, which served as the official seat for the Lord Lieutenant of Ireland.

Canada

Three sanctuaries in Canada have the designation of Chapel Royal, and all of them are located in the province of Ontario.

Mohawk Chapel in Brantford was designated as a Chapel Royal in 1904 by Edward VII. The designation was made in recognition of the historic alliance between the Mohawk people and the Crown, referred to as the Covenant Chain. In 2004, Elizabeth II designated Christ Church near Deseronto as a Chapel Royal. The chapel served as the church for the Tyendinaga Mohawk Territory, and was designated as a Chapel Royal in recognition of the community's military service.

The first two Chapels Royal are situated within Mohawk communities that were established in Canada after the American Revolutionary War. Several gifts from the Crown were bestowed on these Chapels Royal, including silver communion services and a Bible from Queen Anne, a triptych from King George III, a Bible from Queen Victoria, and a bicentennial chalice from Queen Elizabeth II. In 2010, Elizabeth II presented to the Mohawk Chapel a set of silver hand bells engraved with the words, "Silver Chain of Friendship, 1710–2010," to commemorate the tricentennial of the first meeting between Mohawk representatives and the Crown.

In April 2016, the Queen approved in principle that St Catherine's Chapel in Toronto be designated a Chapel Royal. The chapel itself is situated within Massey College, a college of the University of Toronto, conceived by Vincent Massey, a former Governor General of Canada. It became Canada's third Chapel Royal on 21 June 2017, during National Indigenous Peoples Day. St. Catherine's Chapel was designated as a Chapel Royal in recognition of the sesquicentennial of Canada, the relationship between Massey College and the Mississaugas of the Credit First Nation, and as a gesture of reconciliation.

See also
 Anglican church music
 Honorary Chaplain to the King
 Religion in Canada
 Religion in the United Kingdom

References

 "London (i), §II, 1: Music at court: The Chapel Royal", Grove Music Online ed. L. Macy (Accessed 16 September 2004), Grovemusic.com 
 The Buildings of England, London 6: Westminster (2003) page 587.
 "Blow, John." Grove Music Online ed. L. Macy (Accessed 13 December 2006), Grovemusic.com 
 "Purcell." Grove Music Online ed. L. Macy (Accessed 13 December 2006), Grovemusic.com

External links

 Her Majesty's 2010 Christmas message from the Chapel Royal Hampton Court
 Website of the British monarchy entry for Chapels Royal
 Chapel Royal of Hampton Court Palace
 Choral Connections
 Friends of Blackburn Cathedral

Monarchy in Canada
British monarchy
Chapels in the United Kingdom
Classical music in the United Kingdom
History of the Church of England
Church of Scotland

English choirs